Popple River may refer to several places:
Popple River (Pine River), in northeastern Wisconsin
Popple River (Black River), in central Wisconsin
Popple River (Minnesota)
Popple River, Wisconsin, a town
Popple River (community), Wisconsin, an unincorporated community